Bahir Dar Airport , also known as Dejazmach Belay Zeleke Airport, is an airport serving Bahir Dar, the capital city of the Amhara Region in Ethiopia. The name of the city and airport may also be transliterated as Bahar Dar. The airport also serves the Ethiopian Air Force.

Facilities 

Airlines and destinations

Incidents 
On 11 January 1981, Douglas C-47A ET-AGW of Ethiopian Airlines was damaged beyond repair when the port undercarriage collapsed on landing.

On 15 September 1988, Ethiopian Airlines Flight 604 operated by Boeing 737-200 ET-AJA ingested pigeons into both engines shortly after takeoff. One engine lost thrust almost immediately and the second lost thrust during the emergency return to the airport. During the crash landing, 35 of the 104 passengers were killed.

References

External links 
 

Airports in Ethiopia
Amhara Region